No Agenda is a podcast hosted by Adam Curry and John C. Dvorak that is recorded twice a week on Thursdays and Sundays at 11 a.m. Pacific Time. The show is primarily focused on mainstream media deconstruction.

The show has no advertisers and instead subsists entirely on donations. There are no guidelines for the amount and frequency of contributions; instead, these are left to the discretion of the listener, a model called "value for value" by the show's hosts. The show also relies on its listeners—dubbed "producers"—to provide artwork and audio clips.

In July 2016, the show won the Podcast Award for Best Podcast in the category "News & Politics." In September 2013, the show was nominated for Podcast Awards in two categories, "People's Choice" and "Politics / News". Talkers Magazine featured the podcast in their "Frontier Fifty", an alphabetically sorted list containing a "Selection of Outstanding Talk Media Webcasters".

In December 2009, the show announced they had reached 450,000 listeners. During an appearance on The Joe Rogan Experience in July 2021, Curry stated that No Agenda has 1–1.4 million listeners per episode.

A primer has been produced for newer listeners, both as an introduction and a discussion of the show.

History
No Agenda debuted in October 2007. Its premise was that the co-founder (Curry) and then vice-president (Dvorak) of mevio (until Oct. 2012) would have an unfiltered dialogue. The impetus for starting the show, according to Curry, was a 4-minute phone call made to Dvorak saying that they "should do a show together." Little thought was given to what the show would be about, in fact only the name was agreed upon before the first show was recorded.

The original tagline of No Agenda was that it would be the show with "no sponsors, jingles, and of course no agenda." The show's only sound effect came during the closing minute, where the jazz song On the Seventh Day by the Marriott Jazz Quintet played as the hosts signed off. Topics included the news of the day, restaurant reviews, and family.

The show gradually moved in the direction of news and political commentary. Jingles have been introduced, and have evolved into catch phrases. The show discusses current news and conspiracy theories, with the hosts discussing topics in response to their belief that the mainstream media glosses over what they see as the real facts. Celebrity gossip and other soft news stories are brought up for ironic effect, with the one that has garnered the most attention often being named "Distraction of the week".

The podcast does not accept advertising and is supported by the listeners to prevent conflicts of interest. Through this direct listener-supported model, those that contribute amounts above a predetermined level are referred to as executive producers.

No Agenda was named to Talkers Magazine's Frontier Fifty list for 2011, a list of 'Outstanding Media Webcasters.'

The show received five out of five microphones in review published by Podcast Magazine.

Influences
Curry tends towards a more counter-cultural outlook of the world. He often discusses links between current world events and historical events, both past and present. Dvorak is even-tempered and often references his knowledge of history and his own life experiences to shed light on the topics of the day. He does share many of Curry's opinions on different topics. Inside jokes and references to previous topics recur with great frequency in each episode which may take time for new listeners to fully grasp. The hosts prefer not to provide a recap or explanation of a phrase or anecdote unless necessary, and Curry will often sound an alarm if Dvorak begins repeating something previously discussed.

The show was influenced by the run up to the 2008 Election, the financial crisis starting that September (the September 13th show carried breaking news of the collapse of Lehman Brothers), and the transition to the Presidency of Barack Obama.

No Agenda Stream
Starting in early 2009, Curry began to stream the audio production of the show live, with both hosts advertising the beginning of the show via Twitter. During the week of March 15, 2009, Curry began to experiment with running the audio stream 24/7, carrying music when No Agenda was not being recorded. By March 19 the stream contained computer speech integration and an auto-DJ. After a few songs the station would break for podcast promos, news updates, and Twitter messages sent to the No Agenda Twitter account from listeners.

The music and speech integration has since been replaced by a schedule of podcasts currently consisting of the latest episode of the show Tech5, music interludes and DH Unplugged. In 2011 the No Agenda Stream added a new daily live show, Dirty Boxers. In between each podcast are one or two No Agenda jingles or soundbites. On Thursdays and Sundays the loop is interrupted for the Pre-show of the No Agenda live recordings, which most often occur in the morning, thus the catch phrase "In The Morning"; and lasting up to about three hours. During this time Curry plays listener produced novelty songs and voice-overs while reading feedback from and interacting with the audience until he is joined by Dvorak.

As of November 2019, the No Agenda stream features the following podcasts in regular rotation: Airline Pilot Guy, Congressional Dish, Cordkillers, DH Unplugged, Grimerica, Grumpy Old Bens, Hog Story, Mark and George Show, Nick the Rat, On the Odd, Randumb Thoughts, RynoTheBearded, That Larry Show, and Who Are These Podcasts.

The No Agenda stream also features live podcasts on a regular schedule. Hog Story airs Monday nights starting at 7:00PM Central. DH Unplugged airs Tuesday nights at 8:00PM Central, Nick The Rat airs Wednesday nights starting at 10:00PM Central, No Agenda airs Thursday mornings starting at 11:00AM Central, Grumpy Old Bens airs Friday mornings starting at 11:00AM Central, Mark and George Show airs Friday afternoons starting at 2:00PM Central time, RynoTheBearded airs Friday nights starting at 6:00PM Central time, No Agenda airs Sunday mornings starting at 11:00AM Central.

No Agenda Social 
No Agenda Social serves as the flagship social media platform for the show. A goal of this platform is to avoid the censorship, restrictions, and rules found on many "Big Tech" social media platforms. It runs Mastodon software and is connected to a network of distributed social media platforms known as the Fediverse. The show hosts are active on the platform, as are numerous listeners and fans of the show.

See also
 Political podcast

References

External links

 
 No Agenda Stream
 
 "No Agenda" permanent backup archives
 No Agenda Player – Annotated Web Player for the Show
 No Agenda Summaries
 Podthoughts by Colin Marshall: "No Agenda"
 NA Shownote Search

Audio podcasts
American news websites
Conspiracy theories
2007 podcast debuts
Creative Commons-licensed podcasts
Political podcasts 
American podcasts
Comedy and humor podcasts